The 1980 Mutual Benefit Life Open, also known as the South Orange Open, was a men's tennis tournament played on outdoor clay courts at the Orange Lawn Tennis Club in South Orange, New Jersey in the United States. The event was part of the 1980 Grand Prix circuit. It was the 11th edition of the tournament and was held from July 28 through August 4, 1980. Second-seeded José Luis Clerc won the  singles title and earned $15,000 first-prize money.

Finals

Singles
 José Luis Clerc defeated  John McEnroe 6–3, 6–2
 It was Clerc's 2nd singles title of the year and the 6th of his career.

Doubles
 Bill Maze /  John McEnroe defeated  Fritz Buehning /  Van Winitsky 7–6, 6–4

References

External links
 ITF tournament edition details

South Orange Open
South Orange Open
South Orange Open
South Orange Open
South Orange Open
Tennis tournaments in New Jersey
South Orange Open